Agios Panteleimonas or Aghios Panteleimonas is a neighbourhood of Athens, located northwest of the centre of Athens between Viktorias Square and Attikis Square. The main street of the district is Acharnon Avenue. The neighbourhood's name is owed in the big church of Agios Panteleimonas (Saint Pantaleon), built in this area during the interwar period.

The church
Agios Panteleimonas, often referred to as Agios Panteleimonas Acharnon because is located along Acharnon Avenue, is one of the biggest churches in Balkans. Its erection started in 1920s and was one of the first buildings built by concrete. At first, only the foundations and the big cupola were built. For a while the works stopped and continued after the second World War. The temple finally completed during 1970s.

Tensions
During the late 2000s, many immigrants from countries of Middle East and Africa settled in Agios Panteleimonas. The rapid increase in immigrants without permanent housing and work in the district brought about an increase of delinquency. The gradual ghettoisation of the area has resulted in a negative reaction by residents and the increase in support of far-right organisations.

Sports
Agios Panteleimonas hosts the basketball club Aetos B.C. with current presence in A2 Ethniki basketball (second division).

References

Neighbourhoods in Athens